Pier Luigi Vestrini (26 January 1905 – 30 November 1989) was an Italian rower. He competed at the 1928 Summer Olympics in Amsterdam with the men's coxed pair where they did not finish in the quarter final. Two brothers, Roberto Vestrini and Renzo Vestrini, were also Olympic rowers.

References

1905 births
1989 deaths
Italian male rowers
Olympic rowers of Italy
Rowers at the 1928 Summer Olympics
Sportspeople from Florence
European Rowing Championships medalists